Fighting for Justice is a 1932 American Pre-Code Western film, directed by Otto Brower. It stars Tim McCoy and Joyce Compton.

The Library of Congress has a copy of this feature.

Cast
Tim McCoy - Tim Keane
Joyce Compton - Amy Tracey
Robert Frazer - Raney
William V. Mong - Gafford
Hooper Atchley - Trent
Henry Sedley - Bull Barnard
Harry Todd - Cooky
Lafe McKee - Sam Tracey
William N. Bailey - Colorado
Harry Cording -
Murdock MacQuarrie - Sheriff
Walter Brennan - Zeke

References

External links
Fighting for Justice at the Internet Movie Database

1932 films
American Western (genre) films
1932 Western (genre) films
Films directed by Otto Brower
American black-and-white films
Columbia Pictures films
1930s American films
1930s English-language films